60S ribosomal protein L34 is a protein that in humans is encoded by the RPL34 gene.

Function 

Ribosomes, the organelles that catalyze protein synthesis, consist of a small 40S subunit and a large 60S subunit. Together these subunits are composed of 4 RNA species and approximately 80 structurally distinct proteins. This gene encodes a ribosomal protein that is a component of the 60S subunit. The protein belongs to the L34E family of ribosomal proteins. It is located in the cytoplasm. This gene originally was thought to be located at 17q21, but it has been mapped to 4q. Transcript variants derived from alternative splicing, alternative transcription initiation sites, and/or alternative polyadenylation exist; these variants encode the same protein. As is typical for genes encoding ribosomal proteins, there are multiple processed pseudogenes of this gene dispersed through the genome.

References

Further reading

External links 
 PDBe-KB provides an overview of all the structure information available in the PDB for Human 60S ribosomal protein L34

Ribosomal proteins